In 1999, Al Ghurair University opened its doors in the UAE, as one of the country’s first private universities, with a mission to elevate the UAE’s learning environment, and to help students achieve their greatest potential. Over the last two decades, the UAE’s higher education sector has grown exponentially, with the country now hosting some of the world’s leading academic institutions.

With the region becoming recognised as a global hub for education, the Al Ghurair family is re-focusing their efforts for a wider impact in the education sector. As such, after 23 years of providing a high quality and affordable educational experience, Al Ghurair University (AGU) closed its doors at the end of the academic year 2021-22, on 31 August 2022.

The Al Ghurair family has always been a strong believer in the power of education  The Al Ghurair family remains passionate in contributing to the development of the UAE’s youth and preparing them for a prosperous future.

The Al Ghurair family remains committed to continuing their support of an educational legacy through the Abdulla Al Ghurair Foundation for Education that has had a positive impact on over 60,000 Emirati and Arab youth since its founding in 2015. Through the Foundation, students are supported to excel in their education journeys across the region and worldwide, including the USA, UK and Canada amongst other countries.

References

1999 establishments in the United Arab Emirates
Universities and colleges in the United Arab Emirates
Educational institutions established in 1999